OpenManage is a product that consists of a number of proprietary network management and systems management applications developed by Dell, Inc.

Overview
Dell OpenManage is a set of systems management applications built using industry standard protocols and specifications. Dell OpenManage is not a product within itself, but rather a brand name for the suite of products in the portfolio.

IT Assistant
Dell OpenManage IT Assistant is a standards-based console for managing Dell servers, storage arrays, tape libraries, network switches, printers, and clients distributed throughout a network. From a central console, one can gain increased control over the availability of Dell platforms through proactive alerts and notification. 

Dell IT Assistant identifies systems experiencing problems and alerts the administrator—helping reduce the risk of system downtime. Using the web-enabled graphical user interface, you can monitor systems anywhere within your network.

NOTE: IT Assistant has been replaced by Dell OpenManage Essentials.

OpenManage Network Manager
Dell EMC OpenManage™ Network Manager (OMNM) monitors and manages multi-vendor networks for vendors such as Dell, Aruba, Cisco, Brocade, Juniper, and HP. 
OMNM provides a unified management system and automates common network management operations for advanced network element discovery, configuration management, and system health monitoring to proactively alert network administrators to potential network problems.

Examples of OMNM functionality include Auto Discovery; Configuration File Back-up, Restore and Deploy; Equipment Management; Equipment Group Management; Event Management; Audit Tracking; Reporting; Compliance; Scheduling; Fault and Performance Management; OS/Firmware Management; and Network Topology. This product is based on Cruz by Dorado Software through an OEM relationship between the two companies.

OpenManage Server Administrator
OpenManage Server Administrator allows system administrators to manage individual servers in two ways: from an integrated, web-browser-based graphical-user-interface (GUI) and from a command-line interface (CLI) through the operating system. Server Administrator is designed for system administrators to manage systems locally and remotely on a network.

Compare Dell Systems Management Server Administrator (DSM SA).

Server Update Utility
Dell OpenManage Server Update Utility is a dual layer DVD-based application for identifying and applying updates to your system. You can use SUU to update your Dell PowerEdge system or to view the updates available for any system supported by SUU. SUU compares the versions of components currently installed on your system with update components packaged on the Dell PowerEdge Server Update Utility DVD. SUU then displays a comparison report of the versions and provides the option of updating the components.

Content Manager
Content Manager ships on the Dell OpenManage Systems Build and Update Utility CD. Content Manager allows you to download Dell Update Packages (DUPs) from the official Dell support website. These packages are then kept in Custom Repositories where you can choose which PowerEdge servers and types of OS updates to store.

Content Manager also has a task to compare your custom repository to the latest downloads available from the official Dell support website. 

When the Custom Repositories are created, the Server Update Utility (SUU), both GUI and CMD versions, are included in the repository. This allows you to map a network drive from your servers to the repository and update the servers from a single location knowing that it contains the latest drivers from the official Dell support site.

Note: Content Manager is no longer shipping or supported and has been replaced by Dell Repository Manager.

Deployment Toolkit
The Dell OpenManage Deployment Toolkit (DTK) includes a set of utilities for configuring and deploying Dell PowerEdge systems. The DTK is designed for customers who need to build scripted installations to deploy large numbers of servers in a reliable fashion without having to dramatically change their current deployment processes.

In addition to the command line utilities used to configure various system features, the DTK also provides sample scripts and configuration files to perform common deployment tasks and documentation. These files and scripts describe the use of DTK in Microsoft Windows Preinstallation Environment (Windows PE) and embedded Linux environments. 

The benefits of the DTK:
 Provides the tools necessary to automate the pre-operating system configuration tasks and the unattended operating system installation tasks when deploying PowerEdge systems.
 Scales to support from one to many system deployment efforts.
 Facilitates consistent system configurations across multiple systems.
 Provides diverse and useful deployment tools that can be utilized in many different ways.

Sources
 Dell OpenManage Network Manager Wiki
 Dell OpenManage Server Administrator
 Dell Community Forum

External links
 Historic Dell OpenManage Community wiki - OpenManage Demos, White Papers, weekly chat sessions, collaborative learning areas. (Other than a November 2011 notice that the wiki is no longer being updated, there have been no substantive updates to the OpenManage Wiki since 2007.)
 OpenManage Resources - Application Demos, Collateral, Dell Power Solutions Articles, Industry Analyst Reports, and White Papers

References

System administration
Dell products